Tomislav "Tommy" Križanović (born November 20, 1984) is a Croatian football coach and former player. He is currently the head coach of Jacksonville Armada U-23.

Playing career
Križanović played four years of college soccer at Jacksonville University between 2003 and 2006. He was later drafted in the fourth round (43rd overall) of the 2007 MLS SuperDraft by FC Dallas, where he spent the 2007 season. Križanović moved to Germany in 2008, where he spent time with Offenburger FV.

He returned to Florida to coach youth soccer and spent time with NPSL side Jacksonville United between 2011 and 2013. He signed with North American Soccer League's Jacksonville Armada FC in January 2015.

Križanović was released by Jacksonville on 4 February 2016.

Coaching career
After several seasons as an assistant coach, Križanović was named head coach of National Premier Soccer League side Jacksonville Armada U-23.

References

External links
 Armada bio

1984 births
Living people
Sportspeople from Slavonski Brod
Soccer players from Jacksonville, Florida
Association football forwards
Croatian footballers
Jacksonville Dolphins men's soccer players
FC Dallas draft picks
FC Dallas players
Offenburger FV players
Jacksonville Armada FC players
North American Soccer League players
Croatian expatriate footballers
Expatriate soccer players in the United States
Croatian expatriate sportspeople in the United States
National Premier Soccer League coaches